A specialty show is a dog show which reviews a single breed, unlike other dog shows, particularly conformation shows, which are generally referred to as "all-breed" because they are open to all breeds recognized by the sponsoring kennel club.

A specialty show may be regional or national. A "Best in Show" win at a national specialty show is tremendously prestigious, indicating that the winning dog or bitch triumphed at a contest which attracted entries from the most serious fanciers of that breed in the country or continent. Some specialty shows attract international entries.

Examples of specialty shows include:
 The regional specialty shows, and the national specialty show, sponsored by the Golden Retriever Club of America
 The regional specialty shows, and the national specialty show, sponsored by the German Wirehaired Pointer Club of America
 National Specialty Show, American Maltese Association
 Border Terrier Show Results in the U.K.

See also
 Best of Breed

References

Dog shows and showing